Bacup is a town in the Rossendale Borough in Lancashire, England, in the South Pennines close to Lancashire's boundaries with West Yorkshire and Greater Manchester. At the 2011 Census, Bacup had a population of 13,323.

Bacup emerged as a settlement following the Anglo-Saxon settlement of Britain in the Early Middle Ages. For centuries, it was a small and obscure centre of domestic flannel and woollen cloth production, and many of the original weavers' cottages survive today as listed buildings. Following the Industrial Revolution, Bacup became a mill town, growing up around the now covered over bridge crossing the River Irwell and the north–south / east-west crossroad at its centre. During that time its landscape became dominated by distinctive and large rectangular woollen and cotton mills. Bacup received a charter of incorporation in 1882, giving it municipal borough status and its own elected town government, consisting of a mayor, aldermen and councillors to oversee local affairs.

In the late 20th century, Bacup became part of the borough of Rossendale. Bacup's historic character, culture and festivities have encouraged the town to be seen as one of the best preserved mill towns in England.  English Heritage has proclaimed Bacup town centre as a designated protected area for its special architectural qualities.

History
The name Bacup is derived from the Old English fūlbæchop. The Oxford Dictionary of British Place Names translates this as "muddy valley by a ridge"; the fūl- element, which meant "foul" or "muddy" was used in the earliest known reference to the area, in a charter by Robert de Lacey, around the year 1200, as used in the Middle English spelling fulebachope. The prefix ful- was dropped from the toponym. The -bæchop element is less clear, possibly meaning "ridge valley", or else  "back valley" referring to the locale's position at the back part of the Irwell Valley.

Bacup and its hinterland has provided archeological evidence of human activity in the area during the Neolithic. Anglo-Saxons settled in the Early Middle Ages. It has been claimed that in the 10th century the Anglo-Saxons battled against Gaels and Norsemen at Broadclough, a village to the north of Bacup. From the medieval period in this area, the River Irwell separated the ancient parishes of Whalley and Rochdale (in the hundreds of Blackburn and Salford respectively). The settlement developed mainly in the Whalley township of Newchurch but extending into Rochdale's Spotland.

The geology and topography of the village lent itself to urbanisation and domestic industries; primitive weavers' cottages, coal pits and stone quarries were propelled by Bacup's natural supply of water power in the Early Modern period. The adoption of the factory system, which developed into the Industrial Revolution, enabled the transformation of Bacup from a small rural village into a mill town, populated by an influx of families attracted by Bacup's cotton mills, civic amenities and regional railway network. Locally sourced coal provided the fuel for industrial-scale quarrying, cotton spinning and shoemaking operations, stimulating the local economy. Bacup received a charter of incorporation in 1882, giving it honorific borough status and its own elected town government, consisting of a mayor, aldermen and councillors to oversee local affairs.

Bacup's boom in textile manufacture during the Industrial Revolution resulted in the town developing into a prosperous and thickly populated industrial area by early-20th century. But the Great Depression and the ensuing deindustrialisation of the United Kingdom largely eliminated Bacup's textile processing sector and economic prosperity.

Bacup followed the regional and national trend of deindustrialisation during the early and mid-20th century; a process exacerbated by the closure of Bacup railway station in 1966. Bacup also experienced population decline; from 22,000 at the time of the United Kingdom Census 1911, to 15,000 at the United Kingdom Census 1971. Much of Bacup's infrastructure became derelict owing to urban decay, despite regeneration schemes and government funding. Shops became empty and some deteriorated. The houses along the main roads endured as the original terraces from Bacup's industrial age, but behind these, on the hillsides, are several council estates.

Records in 2005 show Bacup to have some of the lowest crime levels in the county, and the relative small change to Bacup's infrastructure and appearance has given the town a "historic character and distinctive sense of place". In 2007, the murder of Sophie Lancaster attracted media attention to the town and highlighted its urban blight and lack of amenities and regeneration.

Regeneration

In 2013 it was announced that Rossendale Borough Council was successful in securing £2m funding from the Heritage Lottery Fund for a 5-year regeneration project, to be delivered by the Bacup Townscape Heritage Initiative (THI). The project focuses on the redevelopment and restoration of Bacup's unique built and cultural heritage whilst providing training in traditional building skills and to facilitate activities and events for local people. The injection of funds has significantly contributed to growing property prices in the area with the investments in the area being cited as one of the major reasons why the area is becoming increasingly attractive to people commuting to larger conurbations such as Greater Manchester.

Due to the success of the Bacup THI and following public research and consultation, in 2019 the Rossendale Borough Council announced the development of the Bacup 2040 Vision and Masterplan. Bacup 2040 sets out a new vision for Bacup, aiming to capitalise on the gains made through the THI scheme whilst redeveloping aspects of the town to make it fit for a high-street model less reliant on retail and more suited to the needs of visitors and local residents alike. In order to realise the scheme, the council considered multiple bid options and the Bacup 2040 Vision was used as the basis of its bid for a share of the £1b Future High Street Fund. The Bacup 2040 Board was established in 2019 and is made up of representatives from across Bacup, including local residents, business owners, community organisations, charities, councillors, council officers. The board is chaired by a local business owner and has 6 sub-group committees, chaired by representatives of different community organisations, reviewing the various aspects of the vision and plan. The role of the board is to "inform, challenge and validate the scope and proposals for the redevelopment of Bacup."

The Bacup 2040 plan for the £11.5m redevelopment of Bacup's core, including the Market Square, was reported on in February 2020 and later announced by the local council in June 2020.

The first stages of the commencement of the Bacup 2040 work was announced in June 2020, with the £1m redevelopment of the long-time derelict Regal Building.

Governance

Lying within the historic county boundaries of Lancashire since the High Middle Ages, Bacup was a chapelry linked with the parishes of Whalley and Rochdale, and divided between the townships of Newchurch and Spotland in the hundred of Blackburn.

Bacup's first local authority was a Local board of health established in 1863; Bacup Local Board of Health was a regulatory body responsible for standards of hygiene and sanitation in the Bacup Urban Sanitary District. The area of the sanitary authority was granted a charter of incorporation in 1882, giving it honorific borough status and its own elected town government, consisting of a mayor, aldermen and councillors to oversee local affairs. The Municipal Borough of Bacup became a local government district of the administrative county of Lancashire under the Local Government Act 1894, meaning it shared power with the strategic Lancashire County Council. Under the Local Government Act 1972, the Municipal Borough of Bacup was abolished, and since 1 April 1974 Bacup has formed an unparished area of Rossendale, a local government district of the non-metropolitan county of Lancashire.

From 1992 until 2010, Bacup was represented in the House of Commons as part of the parliamentary constituency of Rossendale and Darwen, by Janet Anderson, a Labour Party Member of Parliament (MP). Bacup had previously formed part of the Rossendale constituency. In the general election of 2010, the seat was taken by Jake Berry of the Conservative Party.

Geography

The Irwell is mostly culverted in central Bacup but it is open in the suburbs. In 2003 there was a proposal to use plate glass for a section of the culvert in the centre of the town however the culvert was eventually replaced with concrete.

Bacup is surrounded by open moor and grassland on all sides with the exception of Stacksteads at the west which forms a continuous urban area with Waterfoot and Rawtenstall. The major towns of Burnley and Accrington are to the north and northwest respectively; Todmorden, Walsden and the county of West Yorkshire are to the east; Rochdale and the county of Greater Manchester are to the south; Rawtenstall, from where Bacup is governed, is to the west. Areas and suburbs of Bacup include Britannia, Broadclough, Deerplay, Dulesgate, Stacksteads and Weir.

Bacup experiences a temperate maritime climate, like much of the British Isles, with relatively cool summers, yet harsh winters. There is regular but generally light precipitation throughout the year.

Landmarks
The towns parish church is dedicated to Saint John the Evangelist. Aside from just this church, Bacup has many other churches.  The majority of Bacup's culturally significant architecture is in the Victorian period, but there are older buildings of note are Fearns Hall (1696), Forest House (1815) and the 18th century Stubbylee Hall. The Bacup Natural History Society Museum was formed in 1878.

Many of the town's historic buildings are set to be renewed in a £2m regeneration scheme.

Transport

Bacup railway station was opened in 1852 by the East Lancashire Railway as the terminus of the Rossendale line. 
The Rochdale and Facit Railway was extended to Bacup in 1883. The Rochdale line closed to passenger services in 1947, and the station finally closed in December 1966, with the cessation of all passenger services to and from Manchester Victoria via Rawtenstall and Bury.

In June 2014 the police announced they would be monitoring the road between Weir and Bacup (which passes through Broadclough) as it has become an accident blackspot with a high number of accidents which have resulted in serious injury and even deaths.

A671 Bypass proposals

There have been a large number of road traffic incidents on the A671 as it passes through the small hamlets of Broadclough and Weir near Bacup including fatalities. Currently police are monitoring the road and there have been calls from local residents, led by County Councillor Jimmy Easton, for the creation of a bypass with the suggestion of utilising elements of Bacup Old Road.

Culture and community
The key date in Bacup's cultural calendar is Easter Saturday, when the Britannia Coconut Dancers beat the bounds of the town via a dance procession.  Britannia Coconut Dancers are an English country dance troupe from Bacup whose routines are steeped in local folk tradition. They wear distinctive costumes and have a custom of blackening their faces. The origin of the troupe is claimed to have its roots in Moorish, pagan, medieval, mining and Cornish customs. The Easter Saturday procession begins annually at the Traveller's Rest Public House on the A671 road. The dancers are accompanied by members of Stacksteads Silver Band and proceed to dance their way through the streets.

Bacup Museum is local history hub and exhibition centre in Bacup. The Bacup Natural History Society was formed in 1878. The work of the society is carried out by a group of volunteers who have a base in the Bacup Museum which contains many domestic, military, industrial, natural history, and religious collections.

Bacup has been used as a filming location for the 1980s BBC TV police drama Juliet Bravo, Hetty Wainthropp Investigates, parts of The League of Gentlemen and much of the film Girls' Night. Elements of the BBC TV drama Oranges Are Not the Only Fruit were also filmed on location in Bacup. The famous 1961 British film Whistle Down the Wind starring Hayley Mills also used various parts of Bacup for filming. The comedy drama Brassic was also largely filmed in Bacup.

Notable people 

 Lawrence Heyworth (1786–1872), Member of Parliament and Radical activist
Isaac Hoyle (1828–1911) a British mill-owner and Liberal politician.
Emily Sarah Holt (1836–1893) an English children's novelist. 
 John B. Sutcliffe (1853–1913), English-American architect
Beatrice Webb, (1858–1943) was an English sociologist, economist, socialist, labour historian and social reformer. She lived amongst textile factory workers in Bacup in the 1880s.
Sir John Maden (1862–1920) a Liberal Party politician, MP for Rossendale, 1892-1900.  
Herbert Bolton (1863–1936) palaeontologist and director of the Bristol Museum and Art Gallery
 Betty Jackson (born 1949) fashion designer; her father owned a shoe factory in town.
 Johnny Clegg (1953–2019), a South African musician from the bands Juluka and Savuka.
Paul Stephenson (born 1953) the Metropolitan Police Commissioner, 2009 to 2011.
 Jennie McAlpine (born 1984) actress, plays Fiz Stape also in Coronation Street.
 Sophie Lancaster, (1986-2007) murder victim.
 Sam Aston (born 1993), actor who plays Chesney Brown in Coronation Street

Sport 
Eddie Cooper (1915–1968) cricketer, right-handed batsman who played 249 first-class matches for Worcestershire
Everton Weekes (1925–2020), cricketer, lived in Bacup and played for Bacup Cricket club between 1949 and 1958.
 Marc Pugh (born 1987) association footballer with over 470 club caps.
Matty James, (born 1991) footballer for Barnsley F.C. with over 200 club caps
 Reece James, (born 1993) footballer for Blackpool F.C. with over 150 club caps

See also

Listed buildings in Bacup

References

Footnotes

Bibliography

External links

 Historic Town Survey – Bacup, Lancs CC

Towns in Lancashire
Unparished areas in Lancashire
Geography of the Borough of Rossendale